Pretty Lake may refer to:

Pretty Lake, fictional town in Between (TV series)
Pretty Lake, on List of lakes in Indiana